Ailsa Lister (born 8 April 2004) is a Scottish cricketer. In October 2020, Lister was named in Scotland's squad to play Ireland at the La Manga Club during their tour of Spain. However, the matches were called off due to the COVID-19 pandemic. In May 2021, Lister was again named in Scotland's squad to face Ireland, this time for a four-match Women's Twenty20 International (WT20I) series in Belfast. She made her WT20I debut on 24 May 2021, for Scotland against Ireland.

In January 2022, she was named in Scotland's team for the 2022 Commonwealth Games Cricket Qualifier tournament in Malaysia.

References

External links

2004 births
Living people
Scottish women cricketers
Scotland women Twenty20 International cricketers
Place of birth missing (living people)